List of populated places in Mardan District.

A 
 Alo

B 
 Babini
 Babozai, Mardan
 Baghdada
 Bakhshali
 Bala Garhi
 Bijli Ghar
Baja kely

C 
 Chamtar
 Charguli

D 
 Dagai
 Dheri
 Deputy Kalli

G 
 Garhi Daulatzai
 Garhi Ismail Zai
 Garyala
 Ghafe
 Gujar Garhi

H 
 Hathian

J 
 Jalala
 Jamal Garhi
 Jhungara

M 
 Muslimabad (Mardan)

P 
 Pirsai

R 
 Rustam, Mardan

S 
 Sadaat Baba
 Sangao (Mardan District)
 Saro Shah
 Sawal Dher
 Shergarh, Mardan

T 
 Takkar
 Tazagram
 Toru, Mardan

References

Populated places in Mardan District